The overwhelming majority of records manufactured have been of certain sizes (7, 10, or 12 inches), playback speeds (33, 45, or 78 RPM), and appearance (round black discs). However, since the commercial adoption of the gramophone record (called a phonograph record in the U.S., where both cylinder records and disc records were invented), a wide variety of records have also been produced that do not fall into these categories, and they have served a variety of purposes.

Unusual sizes

The most common diameter sizes for gramophone records are 12-inch, 10-inch, and 7-inch. Early American shellac records were all 7-inch until 1901, when 10-inch records were introduced. 12-inch records joined them in 1903. By 1910, other sizes were retired and nearly all discs were either 10-inch or 12-inch, although both sizes were normally a bit smaller than their official diameter. In Europe, early 10-inch and 12-inch shellac records were produced in the first three decades of the twentieth century. 7-inch children's records were sold before World War II but nearly all were made of fragile shellac, not an ideal material for use by children. In the late 1940s, small plastic records, including some small picture discs, replaced them. Ten-inch children's records were made as well, but the 7-inch size was more compatible with small hands. The 7-inch size was also used for flexi discs which were popular in Japan where they were known as sound-sheets and were often in traditional round format. In other areas, flexi discs were usually square and often included in a magazine (see Unusual materials and uses below).

Numerous unusual diameters have been produced since the early 1900s ranging from 2 to 19.7 inches. Oddly shaped discs were also produced (see Unusually shaped discs below).

Unusual speeds

The most common rotational speeds for gramophone records are  revolutions per minute (rpm), 45 rpm, and 78 rpm. Established as the only common rotational speed prior to the 1940s, the 78 became increasingly less common throughout the 1950s and into more modern decades as the 33 and the 45 became established as the new standards for albums and singles respectively. Throughout the history of the recording industry, however, numerous unusual turn-speeds ranging from 3 to 130 rpm have been utilized for a variety of purposes.

Varying and variable play-speeds
In the early 1920s, the World Record Company in the U.K. introduced longer-playing records with speeds measured in inches per second (but specified on the label by a letter from A to D) rather than revolutions per minute. If the sound quality near the label of an ordinary record was considered acceptable, then playing time could be greatly increased by using that same groove-to-needle velocity throughout the recording. This is known as the CLV (constant linear velocity) format, as opposed to the usual CAV (constant angular velocity) format. The World Record Controller was an attachment for ordinary record players that slowed the turntable down when playing the outside of the record and allowed it to gradually speed up as the needle was carried inward by the groove. Of course, only special World records could be used. The World system was a commercial failure. The principle, first proposed in a fundamental U.S. sound recording patent in 1886, was briefly revived in 1939–1940 for the unusual "Cinematone Penny Phono" jukebox (price to play one selection: one cent), which used it to squeeze ten short recordings of current pop songs onto each side of one 12-inch record. Compact discs and DVDs use the CLV format to make efficient use of their surface areas.

The CLV format would reemerge in the 1940s and 1950s in office dictation machines known as the Gray Audograph and the CGS/Memovox, which combined it with the flexible-disc format and the inside-out recording format used by CDs today. Both machines recorded at a fixed pitch, but the Grey Audograph could only record at one linear speed allowing 15 minutes per side of a 7-inch disc. The CGS or Memovox, on the other hand, had a High Fidelity speed as well as a Speech speed, allowing over two hours of recording time per side on a 12-inch disc.

In the 1970s, Atlantic Records started producing a series of albums later designated on a label known as Syntonic Research. Each album consisted of two full-side tracks, usually at least half an hour long per side, of sounds recorded of various locations. For example, one side would have ocean waves crashing against the shore and the other would have the sounds of birds chattering away in an aviary; another record might have frogs, crickets and birds making their usual vocalizations that were heard in the early morning hours of a swamp or lake. There were a few dozen made. These were mostly used for soundscape or relaxation purposes. The first album in the series noted on its back cover that either side could be enjoyed in stereo at any playing speed (from 45 rpm to  rpm) depending on the effect desired by the person playing the record.

Microgrooved 78s
A small number of 78 rpm microgroove vinyl recordings have been issued by smaller and underground performers, mainly as novelty items, from the 1970s to the present. In 2006, the Belfast singer Duke Special released a number of ten inch EPs in 78 rpm. A series of 78 rpm microgroove records was issued by the "Audiophile" label during the early LP era. They were supposed to provide higher quality sound than 33 rpm by virtue of their faster rotation speed combined while also providing significantly longer playing time than standard groove 78 rpm records.

Unusual holes
The spindle and any records stacked on it rotated with the turntable, so that each waiting disc was already up to speed before it dropped. Large mechanized spindle adaptors were supplied with most multi-speed automatic record changers sold in the 1950s and 1960s, but they were not as fast and efficient. The large hole also facilitates use in jukeboxes, which mechanically place the "45" onto a turntable with a conical spindle having a matching diameter at its base, making the placement operation easier, safer, and surer than it was with the small-diameter holes and spindles in 78 rpm jukeboxes. 

Most 7-inch records in the USA continue to be pressed with a large hole, requiring an adapter to be used on standard turntables. In other territories such as Europe, 7-inch records intended for home use have standard-sized holes. Many such 7-inch records had a center which could be easily snapped out, yielding a record with a larger hole to be used in jukeboxes or certain record-stacking players; this approach was common in the United Kingdom from the 1950s until the early 1980s, with standard, solid centres becoming gradually more common. Some 7-inch singles in the early-mid-1990s had large holes also, but this was a rarity.

Early on, some 78 rpm records had larger holes in freebie marketing schemes that sold a phonograph cheaply, but required purchase of compatible discs at full-price.

Multi-hole records
Some records had more than one hole in the label area. Busy Bee, in a marketing scheme similar to Standard et al. would employ a second cut-out area. This allowed the Busy Bee disc to also be played on a standard phonograph in addition to the proprietary format sold by the O'Neill-James Company.

Many blank acetate discs have multiple holes (usually three or four) intended to prevent slippage during cutting.

NON's Pagan Muzak (Gray Beat, 1978) is a one-sided 7-inch with multiple locked grooves and two center holes, meaning each locked groove can be played at two different trajectories as well as any number of speeds. The original release came with instructions for the listener to drill more holes in the record as they saw appropriate.  Later pressings of the release were made only with one standard center spindle hole.

Unusual grooves

"Trimicron" discs  

Developed in the mid-1970s by the firm MDR (Magnetic Disc Recording), the Trimicron record enjoyed a brief success. The principle was to remove the empty space between each groove. On average, this empty space is as wide as two grooves, and because of this, its removal effectively triples the duration of the recording that could be engraved (on average, 55 minutes on a 33 rpm record). The Trimicron process was created by Dr. Rabe, a music lover in his spare time, and was originally intended for classical music listeners who could not stand having to flip a record in the middle of a piece. For example, all six Brandenburg concertos could fit on one Trimicron record.

However, this process suffered from a major problem: the finer groove decreased the dynamics and the level of recorded signal by nearly 40 percent. It is therefore necessary to play Trimicron records on silent, high performance turntables, equipped with new diamonds and very high performance. Almost 30 Trimicron records were released, though copies are nowadays rare, especially in good condition.

Multiple bands
Some records are cut with completely independent bands on the same side. In this case, the bands appear as separate tracks on the record and are not intertwined as with parallel grooves (see below). This has most often been used on educational records but is also sometimes used on discs of commercial pop and rock music. These individual bands need not be cut at the same speed. The second Moby Grape album Wow/Grape Jam (1968) has this setup. Following the fourth song on side one there is a spoken announcement telling the listener to change the speed from 33 to 78 rpm to play the next band of the disc. To play the last song on the side the listener must pick up the stylus from the record, change the speed, then put the stylus at the start of the fifth and final song on side one.

The Gorillaz debut album, like the CD release, features the remix of "Clint Eastwood" as a bonus track but the LP has a recorded locked groove after what is meant to be the final track of the album so the needle has to be physically lifted and moved to play the bonus track.

This concept has been extended to the production of records consisting entirely of circular multiple bands to provide collections of infinite loop sound samples of duration limited to one revolution of the disc. Notable examples of this are the releases from RRRecords of the 7-inch RRR-100 (with 100 individual bands) and the 12-inch RRR-500 (with 500 bands) and RRR-1000 (with 1,000 bands.)

Sound recorded in locked grooves
Most records have a locked groove at the end of each side or individual band. It is usually a silent loop that keeps the needle and tonearm from drifting into the label area. However, it is possible to record sound in this groove, and some artists have included looping audio in the locked groove.

One of the best-known examples of this technique was The Beatles' Sgt. Pepper's Lonely Hearts Club Band (1967). Many UK copies featured a multi-layered collage of randomized chatter in their run-off loops. However, two variations were made: the original British pressing (black label with gold logo) has the "inner groove" play through the entire locked groove and does not include the laughter at the beginning of the piece. The re-issue of the British pressing (black label with silver logo) starts playing the "inner groove" long before the needle reaches the locked groove, includes the laughter and, once the needle hits the locked groove, the listener only hears the last two seconds of the piece played over and over again. The Who responded by putting a musical locked groove at the end of their 1967 album The Who Sell Out.

On ABBA's album Super Trouper, there is cheering and applause recorded before and on the locked groove of the B side, after "The Way Old Friends Do". On The Format's album Dog Problems, the feedback at the end of "If Work Permits" continues into the lock-groove, which repeats. Early copies of Pink Floyd's album Atom Heart Mother have the sound of a dripping tap repeating at the end of side two. The B-side of The Damned's single "Love Song" ends the song "Suicide" with an eternal yell in the lock-groove. Peter Gabriel's second album (also known as Scratch), The Boomtown Rats's album The Fine Art of Surfacing, and the Dead Kennedys album Plastic Surgery Disasters also utilize the technique. Sonic Youth's 1986 album Evol contains a locked groove at the end of the final track, "Expressway to yr. Skull (Madonna, Sean, and Me)" and the track's length is indicated on the label as "∞".

British rock band Squeeze released their "Packet of Three" EP in 1977. On the original 7 inch, the A-side track "Cat on a Wall" ends with sustained guitar feedback repeating in the lock-groove.

English new wave band The Look released their single "I Am the Beat" in 1980, which ended with the distinctive drum beat and vocal being repeated in the lock-groove.

The electro act Planet Patrol released the single "Play At Your Own Risk" in 1982. The original 12-inch release sees the A-side repeating its persistent echoed vocal in the lock-groove.

San Francisco noise-punk band Flipper released a track on the B-side of their "Sex Bomb" single, called "Brainwash" which includes a use of the lock-groove concept. The song is a simple punk groove, with barely audible singing, lasting less than 30 seconds, over which one of the vocalists apparently attempts to tell a story, reciting the following: "Umm ... okay, like. see there was this ... and ... w-and then the- ... nevermind, forget it, you wouldn't understand anyway." The music stops at the end of the "story," only to start up again. This process is repeated for a total of 12 times. The last repetition ends with the loop groove endlessly repeating the phrase "forget it, you wouldn't understa— forget it, you wouldn't understa—."

Yer' Album, the debut album by the James Gang has a locked groove at the end of each side, with the inner spiral on side one leading to the inner groove with the spoken phrase "Turn me over," and the inner spiral of side two leading to the inner groove with the spoken phrase "Play me again."

The 12-inch vinyl reissue of Kid A by Radiohead includes a locked groove at the end of side A (AKA "side alpha") which repeats the sound heard at the beginning of the song The National Anthem.

On the original vinyl release of Fly by Night by Rush, the chimes heard at the end of "By-Tor & the Snow Dog" continue into the locked groove.

The 1981 album Difficult To Cure by the rock band Rainbow allows a sample of laughter by Oliver Hardy after the instrumental title track on side 2 to loop indefinitely.

Another example of recorded locked groove record is Godspeed You! Black Emperor's debut album F#A#∞ (pronounced F-sharp, A-sharp, Infinity). On the vinyl release of this album, at the end of the song  "Bleak, Uncertain, Beautiful ..." there is a string phrase recorded on the locked groove. The title's "infinity" refers to this phrase. The Stereolab album Transient Random Noise Bursts With Announcements ends with the song "Lock Groove Lullaby" which, as the name suggests, extends into the locked groove. Nail by Scraping Foetus Off The Wheel (1985) features a recorded lock groove on the final song ("Anything") which results in the final note of the album slowly repeating itself. Portugal. The Man's 2008 album Censored Colors contains a locked groove at the end of the first disc repeating the words "turn me over." The second side of the live King Crimson album USA has a locked groove that contains the first few seconds of applause after they finish playing "21st Century Schizoid Man." The first Kissing the Pink album, Naked, features a recorded locked groove at the end of side one which continuously plays the last note of "The Last Film." The Otto von Schirach album Pukology is pressed on two 7-inch colored discs (one yellow, one transparent brown), all four sides end in recorded locked grooves. One side ends with repeated burping, one side ends with repeated toilet flushing, one side ends with what sounds like tape/record scratching, and one side ends with repeated vomiting.

The Arcade Fire album The Suburbs ends side 3 with a continuous loop of the repeated piano chord heard throughout "We Used to Wait."

Welsh band Super Furry Animals released the album Rings Around The World as a 3-record set on Epic Records. Sides 1, 2 and 4 played normally. Side 3 played from the inside out and side 5 was on a 7-inch single. The side consisted of one recorded groove in the center of the record and was a perfectly timed loop of the music of a non-album song called "All the Shit U Do."

An example of a live album with a locked groove is Eagles Live: The applause at the end of side 4 would continue into the locked groove, rather than fading out like on the other sides.

On the 12-inch single of Spice released in 1990 by Eon, the locked groove at the end of the disc continues the instrumental lead-out of the track indefinitely as long as the DJ wished to let it play.

There are also many techno records featuring loops as recorded locked grooves, which will continuously repeat the beats and musical phrases, which can then be utilized by a DJ. Warp20, the 20th anniversary box set from Warp Records, features two 10-inch locked groove albums, each containing 20 looped tracks from the record label's most popular artists. Both album sleeves contain correct turntable pitch speed settings for each track. Another example is Luke Slater's "Diesel Drudge," from his 1994 EP Planetary Funk Vol 4, which also ends in a locked groove. Speedy J's 2002 album Loudboxer was released on CD with 15 songs segued together, but the double LP version consists of 200 locked grooves, each with its own four-letter title.

The first known hit single to have a recorded locked groove is "Muskrat Love" by Captain & Tennille. A few years later, in December 1975, a British artist known as Chris Hill did a break-in record (see Dickie Goodman or Bill Buchanan) called, "Renta Santa" on Philips 6006-491 that included a recorded locked groove at the end of the side.

Sound recorded in lead-in grooves
When automatic record changers, auto replay adapters and jukeboxes began appearing in the 1920s the need arose to find a more reliable and forgiving way to accurately direct the stylus to the start of the recorded area as well as signal the end of a performance. Appearing near the outer edge of the record and leading the stylus inward to the performance, Decca introduced the lead-in groove in 1935 in the US, with the industry following soon thereafter. Lead-in groove length, positioning, and motion varied by manufacturer and era, with some moving slower (some requiring several revolutions before encountering audio) and others being very short and jerky. As with the recorded locked groove at the end, it is possible to record sound into the lead-in groove. King Crimson's USA (mentioned above) has this feature. George Harrison's Wonderwall Music and the Dead Kennedys' Plastic Surgery Disasters also start in the lead-in groove.

Parallel grooves

Also known as concentric grooves, it is possible to master recordings with two or more separate, interlaced spiral grooves on a side. Such records have occasionally been made as novelties. There were so-called Puzzle Plates produced by the Gramophone Company in London in 1898 and 1899: these were discs with two interleaved tracks, issued as E5504, 9290, 9296. Their most famous was a three-track Puzzle Plate (9317) given as prize for a competition in 1901, for which many master recordings had to be made, distinguished by suffix letters against the catalogue number. Victor made one as early as 1901. Depending on where the needle is dropped in the lead-in area, it will catch more or less randomly in one of the grooves. Each groove can contain a different recording, so the record "magically" plays one of several different recordings. Victor marketed a few 10-inch 78s with two concentric grooves (called Puzzle Record). Columbia also issued a few 10-inch 78s in 1931 with concentric grooves for their cheap Harmony, Clarion, and Velvet Tone labels. In the blank edge of the record, there was a stamp 'A' and 'B', which indicated where each of the concentric grooves started.

A 1950s RCA Victor 45 rpm single by The Fontane Sisters, "The Fortune Teller Song" offered a song with four different "fortunes" as endings. Due to the space consumed by the multiple grooves, the song itself played for only about one minute. In the 1960s, promoter George Garabedian of Mark 56 Records created a "Magic Record" which would randomly play a tune by Arthur Lyman, The Marathons' novelty song "Peanut Butter," or an imitation Tijuana Brass number. Garabedian's records were made to be given away as premiums, usually by potato chip manufacturers. The opening track of Zacherle's 1962 LP Scary Tales consisted of three parallel grooves of the same song, each containing different lyrics (an assortment of humorous, macabre retellings of Mother Goose rhymes).

A more recent example is Monty Python's Matching Tie and Handkerchief.  A promotional EP by Rush, Rush 'n Roulette (mentioned in the book Rare Rock: A Collector's Guide by Tony Rees) had six parallel grooves of different Rush songs.  Also Tool's 1992 EP release Opiate featured on the second side a double groove that would either play the first track of side two or the hidden song that was found at the end of the CD version. The Marillion Brave vinyl has a double groove on side four, ending the album either happily with the track Made Again or less so with water noise. In 2005, a 7-inch single titled "The Road Leads Where It's Led" by The Secret Machines was released in UK that contained both tracks on one side on parallel grooves. The Summer 1980 Mad magazine Super Special included a one-sided sound sheet (see "flexidisc" above), playable on a standard turntable. It had eight interlaced grooves, each track starts with the same happy and upbeat "Super Spectacular Day" beginning of the song but have eight different dark and gloomy endings. In the 1980s, Rhino Records re-released the Henny Youngman comedy album 128 Greatest Jokes as a series of concentric grooves, which they call a "Trick-Track Master". Each side of the album has four grooves. 

In the 1980s, the band Pink Slip Daddy released a 10-inch single called "LSD" on clear pink vinyl with pink glitter inside the vinyl. One side of the single had one song that played from inside out and, on the other side, there were two songs that were pressed as concentric grooves. Many of The Shins' 7-inch records have parallel grooves (such as their 2007 single "Phantom Limb," which has "Nothing at All" and "Split Needles (Alt. Version)" on the b-side.) The band None of Your Fucking Business released a one-sided 7-inch called "NOYFB Escapes from Hell" (side 2 has a groove, but there is no audio encoded in the groove), with 2 grooves that started from the center and ended on the outside of the disc. One groove ran at 45 rpm, while the other ran at 33 rpm. UK punk rocker Johnny Moped's debut album Cycledelic has a lead track with a parallel groove listed on the label as "0. Mystery Track," which runs parallel to the track. The 12-inch single for rap group De La Soul's 1989 song "Me Myself and I" has two different tracks in a parallel groove on the B-side. One groove has the Oblapos remixes of "Me Myself and I," while the other has "Brain Washed Follower. One version of the 12-inch single of The Sensual World by Kate Bush has the instrumental version of the track in a parallel groove - while the instrumental version also appears on side B as one of two sequential tracks."

Records with parallel grooves have been used in games to provide multiple outcomes, chosen either deliberately or randomly, depending on the game.  In 1971, Mattel introduced a game called "Talking Football," in which two players simulate a game of American football.  Plays are recorded on small discs, each with six parallel grooves.  The player on offense chooses one of ten possible offensive plays, each recorded on one disc, and inserts the corresponding disc into a handheld record player.  The other player, without knowing which disc was inserted, then chooses one of six possible defensive plays, marked on the disc so that the record player plays the correct groove corresponding to the chosen combination of offensive and defensive plays.  Some plays result in a penalty or turnover, which requires inserting a special disc for that situation, which is unmarked and therefore a random outcome is selected.

In 1975, Ronco UK released a parallel groove game called "They're Off," which featured four 12-inch discs each containing eight possible outcomes on a horse race. It featured Noel Whitcomb, a well-known horse-racing commentator of the day and the game revolved around betting which "horse" would win the race on that occasion. This appears to have been based on a Canadian product called "They're at the Post" by Maas Marketing, which is more or less the same game with different recordings on the discs to reflect the target market.

Inside-to-outside recording and hill-and-dale recording
In the late 1920s and early 1930s, the Vitaphone sound system used large sixteen-inch  rpm records to provide the soundtrack for motion pictures. The record rotated in the usual clockwise direction but the groove was cut and played starting at the inside of the recorded area and proceeding outward. This inside start was dictated by the unusually long playing time of the records and the rapid wearing down of the single-use disposable metal needles which were standard for playing lateral-cut shellac records at that time. The signal degradation caused by a worn needle point was most audible when playing the innermost turns of the groove, where the undulations were most closely packed and tortuous, but fairly negligible when playing the outermost turns where they were much more widely spaced and easily traced. With an inside start the needle point was freshest where it mattered most.

Almost all analog disc records were recorded at a constant angular speed, resulting in a decreasing linear speed toward the disc's center. The result was a maximum level of signal distortion due to low groove velocity nearest the center of the disc, called "end-groove distortion". Loud musical passages were most audibly affected. Since some music, especially classical music, tends to start quietly and mount to a loud climax, such distortion could be minimized if the disc was recorded to play beginning at the inner end of the groove. A few such records were issued, but the domination of automatic record changers, and the fact that symphony movements, for example, varied greatly in length and could be difficult to arrange appropriately on 20-minute disc sides, made them no more than curiosities.

Until the 1920s, French Pathé Records used inside start and other commercially distinctive grooving. At that time they cut all discs vertically, meaning the vibrations in the grooves were "hill and dale", as their wax cylinders had always been. The records required a special sapphire stylus and a vertically responsive reproducer for playback.

An example was those made by the New York Judson Studios, starting in about 1928 or 1929 and running into the 1930s. Each record was 12 inches, made of standard shellac, started in the inner groove and had a locked groove at the outer edge. Some radio transcription discs had both outside and inside-start as a way to maintain the fidelity levels when the record was turned over.

Inventor Thomas Edison, who always favored the cylinder for all its advantages, also cut his discs with vertically modulated grooves from their introduction in 1912 until a year or two before his company's demise in 1929 (Edison Disc Records). Edison pioneered fine groove discs that played for up to five minutes per 10-inch side; they were very thick to remain perfectly flat and played back with a precision-ground diamond stylus. A commercially unsuccessful extension of the system introduced grooves nearly twice as fine as those of microgroove LPs, yielding playing times of up to 20 minutes per side at 80 rpm and again requiring a special diamond stylus. Even more than with Pathé discs, Edison's vertical-cut records called for specially designed equipment for playback.

When using a modern stereo cartridge to play these or other vertical-cut monophonic recordings, the polarity of one channel must be inverted at some point before the two channels are combined to produce a mono signal, as is desirable; otherwise, they largely cancel each other out, leaving little more than surface noise audible.
In 1977, Mercury Records released a pair of dealer-only promotional LPs called Counter-Revolutions (samplers of various Mercury popular artists at the time) which played from the inside-out and had a locking groove at the disc's edge.
In 1984, Many Records in Italy released an Italo disco song named "Back To Zero" by Francis Lowe that played from the edge of the label outwards on side B, and normally on side A.
In 1985, Memory Records in Germany released a limited-edition version of the Italo disco hit "Talking to the Night" by Brian Ice that played from the edge of the label outwards.
In 1993, American metal band Megadeth released a single "Sweating Bullets," on 12-inch blue vinyl with both sides running from the inside of the disc outwards.
In 1994, the Cyrus 12-inch single "Inversion" released by Basic Channel had one side that played inside out.
In 1997, English Sound Artist Janek Schaefer released his first ever record, "His Master's Voices" a transparent two sided LP. Both sides play from the inside to the outside of the disc.
In 1998, American hardcore punk band Dropdead released their second untitled album, the A side of which plays inside out.
In 1999, English Noise Artist Paul Nomex released a Parallel Groove 12-inch, "Are you more than just a product of your influence" that plays from the inside out on both sides at both 16 and 78 speeds.
In 2014, American alternative rock group Camper Van Beethoven released a two-disc reissue of their Key Lime Pie album, featuring one side that plays the song "Closing Theme" from the inside out at 45 rpm.
In the 2010s, German classical music label Tacet issued some classical recordings that played from the inside out, including Ravel's Boléro (2013) and the fourth movement of Beethoven's Ninth Symphony (2016).

Early multiple track (i.e., stereophonic) format
Before the development of the single-groove stereo system circa 1957, at least three companies: Cook Records, Livingston Audio Products, and Atlantic Records, released a number of "binaural" recordings. These were not created using binaural recording techniques, but rather one side of each record consisted of two long, continuous tracks — one containing the left channel, and the other containing the right channel. It was intended that the buyer purchase an adapter from Cook Laboratories or a tonearm from Livingston that allowed two cartridges to be mounted together, with the proper spacing, on a single tone arm. Over 50 records were released using this format.

Quadraphonic formats
Quadraphonic records present four channels of audio, requiring specialized pickups and decoding equipment to reproduce the two additional channels' signals from the groove.

Disc noise reduction formats
In the 1970s and 1980s, more than a thousand audiophile records were produced with audio tracks specially encoded to be played back through various noise reduction systems in order to reduce noise and increase the dynamic range. Systems employed include dbx disc (1973–1982), Telefunken/Nakamichi High-Com II (1979–1982), CBS CX 20 (1981–1982), and UC (1983–1989).

Vibration-resistant discs
Highway Hi-Fi was a system of proprietary records and players designed for use in automobiles, utilizing a slower play speed and high stylus pressure.

Unusual materials and uses

With their origin stretching back to the dawn of recorded sound at the turn of the 20th century, flexible recording media have been made from a variety of materials including foil, paper, and–in the 1950s–thin flexible vinyl known as flexi discs.

Thin, flexible paper-based records were briefly popularized in the 1930s by Hit of the Week Records and Durium Records. "Melody Cards" were popular in the late 1950s. They took the form of an oversized rectangular postcard with the usual address and greeting space on one side and an illustration on the other. The illustration was overlaid with a transparent plastic material into which the grooving was impressed. The recording was usually musical as the name implies. They typically played at 45 rpm. It was recommended to not write on them with a ball point pen, an invention which was just coming into common use at that time. Laminated cardboard records have been produced as integral promotional novelties on packaging, most notably on the backs of cereal boxes in the late 1960s and early 1970s.

Beginning in the 1940s, flexible records began to be used in the form of "book records"–spiral bound paper publications and four or five flexible record sheets bound in. A spindle hole went through the entire assembly. Book records could be opened to one of the records and completely folded back around itself, so that the whole thing could be placed on the turntable and played intact.

In the 1950s, advances in vinyl production technology led to the development of the 7-inch 33 rpm flexi disc record. Only seen occasionally in the 1950s, these recordings were increasingly used as inserts in magazines that included audio supplements from the 1960s through the 1980s. The recordings were pressed on very thin, flexible sheets of vinyl (or laminated paper), providing a mixture of economy, practical utility and novelty appeal. Flexi discs or Soundsheets were often provided by music publishers to their customers, frequently school band and orchestra directors, marching band and drum corps leaders and others, with their printed catalogs of sheet music. The director could then hear a sample recording of the piece as they looked at an excerpt from the musical score.

In the late 1970s and early 1980s, when computer programs and other binary data were often stored on audio cassettes, a number of microcomputer hobbyist magazines published "flexible program sheets" under various trademarked names including "Floppy ROM", "Flexisoft", and "Discoflex". These bound-in thin plastic 33 rpm audio recordings stored computer data such as video game programs that would be played on a turntable and dubbed onto a cassette. It was also possible to connect the record player's output to the computer's cassette (analog signal) input port and load the data into the computer directly. This method of storing computer data later expanded to include non-flexi-disc novelty releases from musicians such as Chris Sievey.

Chocolate records about three inches in diameter, and small players made for them, were marketed as a novelty in Europe in 1903–1904. After a record or its amusement power wore out, it could be eaten.

In 1973, the Kingdom of Bhutan issued several unusual postage stamps that are playable miniature phonograph records. These thin plastic single-sided adhesive-backed 33 RPM discs feature folk music and tourism information. Not very practical for actual postal use and rarely seen canceled, they were designed as revenue-generating novelties and were initially scorned as such by most stamp collectors. Their small diameters (approximately 7 and 10 cm or 2.75 and 4 inches) make them unplayable on turntables with automatic return tonearms.

In the Soviet Union in the 1930s and 1960s, bootleg copies of banned Western music were individually recorded onto used medical x-ray film and sold on the black market. These were called "ribs" or 'Roentgenizdat'.

Unusual appearance

Colored records
The first discs by Berliner Gramophone were black, and that has been the standard color for gramophone records ever since. But as early as 1899, the Vitaphone Talking Machine Co. made records that were brownish-red in color. The American Record Company produced records made of blue shellac for their flagship label, although pressings for client labels were made in standard black.  Unusual colors, and even multi-colored shellac first appeared in the 1910s on such labels as Vocalion Records. In the 1920s, several companies made records of various shades of brown, including Perfect Records and Grey Gull Records.

When RCA Victor launched the 7-inch 45 rpm record, they initially had eight musical classifications (pop, country, blues, classical, children's, etc.) each with not only its own uniquely colored label but with a corresponding color vinyl. According to experts at the Sarnoff Center in Princeton, New Jersey, the cost of maintaining eight vinyl colors became too high, but the different colored labels were continued, at least for popular music (black) and classical (red, as in "Red Seal"). In October 1945, RCA Victor put on the market its first "non-breakable" phonograph records. Made of a ruby-red, translucent vinyl resin plastic, they cost twice as much ($2 per disc) as the 12-inch Victor Red Seal. In the 1960s, a distinction was made in label colors of promotional copies of 45 RPM records as well, with pop music being issued on yellow labels and country on light green.

In the 1970s, such gimmicks started to reappear on records, especially on 7-inch and 12-inch singles. These included using colored acetate instead of black vinyl. Available colors included clear, transparent white, red, blue, yellow and multi-hued.

Faust released their debut album with transparent vinyl and cover in 1971, and a transparent 12-inch of Queen's The Invisible Man was released. In the 1980s, the ska band Bad Manners released a single on Magnet Records called "Samson And Delilah" that was pressed on clear vinyl, with a clear label and clear print on the label and it came in a clear sleeve. In 1983, American post-punk band Talking Heads released the album Speaking in Tongues; a limited number of copies were pressed on clear vinyl and included in an elaborate plastic case designed by Robert Rauschenberg. 

Some recordings were released in several different colors, in a deliberate effort to sell the same product to one person multiple times as collector's items. Currently, it is common practice for hardcore punk to release records of different colors at the same time, and press a smaller number of one color than the other. This has created a culture of hardcore record collecting based on having the same release multiple times, each copy with a different and more rare color.

The 1977 release of the 45 rpm single of "Strawberry Letter 23" by The Brothers Johnson was produced by A&M Records with a slightly pink center label (as opposed to the usual buff color that A&M uses), and had strawberry scent embedded into the plastic to make the record give off the odor of strawberries.

Adrian Snell's 1979 album Something New Under the Sun was produced on opaque yellow vinyl, in reference to the name of the album.

Kraftwerk released a 12-inch single of "Neon Lights," made of glow-in-the-dark plastic in 1978. Penetration released a luminous vinyl limited edition of the album Moving Targets in 1978 and the "Translumadefractadisc" (Han-O-Disc) punk sampler picture disc (which had a silk screened luminous ink under the litho on Mylar film image of Medusa) was released by The Label (U.K) in 1979. The Foo Fighters' debut single "This Is a Call" was available on 12-inch glow-in-the-dark vinyl, and Luke Vibert also released a glow-in-the-dark 11-inch EP in 2000. In late 2010 - early 2011, dubstep artist Skrillex released a limited 500 copy run of his EP Scary Monsters and Nice Sprites on 12-inch glow-in-the-dark vinyl.

The Canadian pressing of Devo's Q: Are We Not Men? A: We Are Devo! album featured spattered-color vinyl, with a grey/white marbled base with splashes of color on the top of that. The UK pressing came in multiple (solid) colors of vinyl and a picture disc edition that came with a flexi-disc (the US edition, however, was plain black).

From the mid 1980s to the early 1990s, Canadian rock singer Bryan Adams released a small number of singles on colored vinyl. Notable examples are "Christmas Time", originally on both black and clear green vinyl and later reissued on red vinyl, and a 12-inch single of "Thought I'd Died And Gone To Heaven" on silver colored vinyl in 1992, in order to commemorate the massive sales of his earlier hit single "(Everything I Do) I Do It For You", which was featured in its full-length version on the disc.

Isis released their first EP Red Sea on tri-colored vinyl. Divided like a pie, one third was red, one third was black, and one third was tan/gold. Other bands have released records with 2 colors, divided down the middle.

Electronic artist Isao Tomita issued a coral or peach vinyl disc of The Bermuda Triangle on RCA Red Seal.

Alternative artist The Dandy Warhols have been known to release all their 7-inch singles on different color vinyl records, and also their LP's. An uncolored, clear, limited release version of their album 'The Dandy Warhols Come Down' was available at the record stores in the band's hometown in 1997.

Jack White's independent label Third Man Records often produces limited editions of their releases on colored, multi-colored and glow-in-the-dark vinyl.

American singer songwriter Madonna released her 2005 album Confessions on a Dance Floor on a double pink vinyl. Her 2008 Hard Candy album was released on a triple package, which two of these LPs are "candy swirled" vinyl discs (pink-white and blue-white "candy swirled" discs like a starlight candy).

The alternative band Jars of Clay released a limited edition version of their 'Inland' album using coke bottle green for the disc.

Picture discs

A picture disc has graphics visible in the grooved playing area, rather than just on an unplayable back side or large label.

Picture discs have been around since the 1920s—or since about 1910, if postcard-size rectangular picture records are included. In the early 1930s, they were a minor gimmick in an attempt to stimulate abysmal depression-era record sales. Most of these early picture discs were simply a very thin clear plastic laminated onto a sheet of printed cardboard before being stamped in a record press. One US series was more substantial. Some suffered from audible defects such as low-frequency noise due to a surface texture or were rapidly worn to shreds by the very heavy pickups and crude steel needles used to play records at that time.

Vogue Records 78 rpm picture discs were made by Sav-Way Industries in 1946 and 1947 and were of high quality both physically and sonically. Their playing surfaces were clear vinyl and there was a sturdy aluminum core disc between the printed sheets. The imagery was usually gaudy and done in 1940s calendar art style. They sold for US$1.05 each, only about 50 percent more than ordinary shellac records, but the list of available titles was short and the recording artists were second-rank at best.

The first 'modern' rock picture disc was introduced as an assortment of artists such as MC5 and The Doors. It was released in 1969 by Elektra/Metronome of Germany and entitled "Psychedelic Underground - Off 2, Hallucinations". The second release was the British progressive rock band Curved Air's first album, Air Conditioning, a UK issue (1970).

Unusually shaped discs

Shaped discs contain an ordinary grooved centre (typically the same as a standard 7-inch) but with a non-grooved outer rim that can be cut to any shape that does not cut into the grooves. These oddly shaped records were frequently combined with picture discs (see above); a trend that was pushed particularly hard by UK record company branches in the mid-1980s. Curiously, uncut test pressings of shaped discs in their original 12-inch form - with the clear vinyl surrounds still intact - are much more sought-after by collectors than the "regular" shapes themselves.

A well known unusually shaped disc is a picture disc by Toto with the song "Africa" on side 1 and "Rosanna" on side 2. It was originally pressed in 1983 and reissued on Record Store Day in 2017.

Screamo bands Jeromes Dream and Orchid released a split in the shape of a skull. The record was considered a 10-inch. It spun at 45 rpm and was one sided. Some came in glow in the dark, some in blood red, and some black and white.

Some extreme examples required smaller grooving than standard 7-inch such as the single "Montana" by John Linnell (of the band They Might Be Giants) which was in the shape of the United States. This record was problematic because record players whose tonearms returned automatically after the record finished playing often did just that before the needle actually reached the song.

Canadian hardcore punk bands Left For Dead and Acrid released a split LP on No Idea Records on 31 July 1997 as a saw-blade shaped vinyl record. When these spun on the record player, they resembled a spinning saw. The rap duo Insane Clown Posse released a sample vinyl featuring songs from their studio album The Wraith: Shangri-La, in the shape of the album's "Joker Card", the Wraith. Alternative rock band Snow Patrol released a specially created web-shaped vinyl for the single "Signal Fire," a song which was used in the film Spider-Man 3.

Queensrÿche released their singles "Empire" and "Jet City Woman" on limited edition shaped discs. The "Jet City Woman" picture disc is in the shape of the band's Tri-Ryche logo.

Etched discs

Usually taking up a blank side of vinyl, rather than containing music, one side of a disc can be pressed with etched or embossed images. This can take the form of autographs, part of the artwork or logos. Earliest records produced by Emile Berliner, and those by other early companies as Zonophone before paper labels were widely used, had their titles and other information etched or incised into the master, or embossed into the stamper (or both) – either way therefore appearing on all the pressings. Many early Edison Diamond Discs did have etched labels as well, with many (if not all) also featuring a little etched picture of Thomas Edison. The Gramophone company pressed their logo at the blank side of their single sided records in the early 1900s, in the same way. Some later single-sided Red Seal records by Victor had a pattern with the word Victor''' on it.

After having already released both colored vinyl singles and picture discs in the 1980s, Canadian rock artist Bryan Adams issued a 12" single of "Can't Stop This Thing We Started" in autumn 1991, which had the front cover photography etched onto side B.

Coheed and Cambria released their fourth album Good Apollo, I'm Burning Star IV, Volume Two: No World for Tomorrow with side four having etched artwork on it incorporating the band's logo. The "B side" of Dinosaur Jr's cover of The Cure's "Just like Heaven" has a bas-relief "sculpture" embossed on its surface. Side 6 of Boards of Canada's Geogaddi has an etching of a nuclear family for the track "Magic Window", albeit to replace the 1 minute 46 second long silent track that appears on digital versions.    

Although these etchings cannot be seen while the record is playing, some are pressed on clear vinyl so the etchings can be seen from both sides. An example of this is the 1997 7-inch of "Freeze the Atlantic" by Cable which has etched fish.

The Japanese rock band Boris (known for their unique LPs; their 2006 album Pink was released on pink vinyl) pressed their 2006 album, Vein, on transparent vinyl with etched artwork on the outer two inches of the record. This causes problems with auto-start phonographs, as the actual grooves of music do not start where the needle is designed to drop. This may cause damage to the needle and record artwork.

The 1980 A&M Records LP of Split Enz's album True Colours was remarkable not only for its multiple cover releases (in different color patterns), but for the laser-etching process used on the vinyl. The logo from the album cover, as well as other shapes, were etched into the vinyl in a manner that, if hit by a light, would reflect in polychromatic colors. This laser etching does not affect the playing grooves. This same process was also used for the 45 single of the band's song "One Step Ahead" from the album Waiata.

The 1981 A&M Records LP of Styx's album Paradise Theatre had a laser-etched design of the band's logo on side two.

The 1990 Mute XL12Bong18 release from Depeche Mode features "Enjoy the Silence" The Quad: Final Mix on side A and the etched image of a rose and a hand-drawn "DM" on side B.

The original soundtrack recording for the film Superman II had a special edition with the Superman "S" shield logo etched five times on each side of the standard black vinyl album.

Disturbed Immortalized (LP) Side 4 is Decorated with etching on whole side.

The 2020 release of the Quake soundtrack by Nine Inch Nails has program code from the game etched into side D.

The 2018 EP Play by Dave Grohl (of Foo Fighters) has a representation of the studio layout with the various instrument stations as laid out in the studio for recording.

Liquid-filled discs

For the release of the soundtrack for the Disney film The Black Hole, a prototype disc filled with aniline dye colored silicone fluids and oils that freely move around was produced; however, leakage proved too great a problem and it was never released.

In 2012, Third Man Records announced a limited edition 12-inch single release of Jack White's "Sixteen Saltines" on a liquid-filled disc, calling it "the first-ever disc of its kind to be made available to the public" and noting the unreleased Black Hole release.

Also in 2012, The Flaming Lips released an extremely limited (and expensive) edition of their double album of collaborations The Flaming Lips and Heady Fwends, which was filled with a diluted mix of blood contributed by several of the collaborators, including Kesha, Chris Martin and Neon Indian's Alan Palomo. It was pressed at United Record Pressing in Nashville at the same time as Jack White's liquid-filled "Sixteen Saltines" 12-inch, and the first copy of the Fwends blood vinyl was traded for two copies of "Saltines."

In 2017, Fonoflo Records released a liquid filled record for Tennessee Jet's Reata featuring double-concentric liquids, being the first of its kind. In an outer chamber on the record, Old Crow whiskey was inserted, while Coca-Cola was inserted to an inner ring. The liquid in most copies has dried up today. Other issues of the album have liquids such as oil, Jack Daniel's whiskey, and Japanese Red Whiskey. 

Other concepts
A BP Fallon single entitled Fame #9, another product of Third Man Records, was pressed in a process dubbed "Single Signal", in which the B-side has different content on the left and right channels of the stereo groove. Listeners with a balance knob on their stereo are instructed to turn it either to the left or the right to play the record correctly.

An album by Christian Contemporary Rock band, Prodigal, titled Electric Eye, included a "locked groove" at the end of their 1984 vinyl, containing a computer software program for the Commodore 64 personal computer. The short BASIC program shows a static screen containing a lightly paraphrased quotation from Albert Einstein and a Biblical verse (John 14:27).

Hologram discs
One of the many features added to the vinyl version of Jack White's 2014 album Lazaretto is a floating hologram image of a spinning angel that appears when the record is played and viewed at from a certain angle.
Additionally, alongside a standard vinyl release, the soundtrack for Star Wars: The Force Awakens was made available on a holographic record that displays an image of the Millennium Falcon'' on one side and a TIE fighter on the other, both spinning at the speed of the record. The deluxe vinyl edition of Rush's 2112 features a hologram of a spinning Red Star of the Federation. All three of these were produced by Tristan Duke for his studio Infinity Light Science.

See also
 Anti-record
 Capacitance Electronic Disc (CED)
 Hidden track
 Lenticular printing
 List of picture discs
 Shaped CD
 Voyager Golden Record
 VinylVideo

References

External links

The Internet museum of records Site devoted entirely to "strange but true recorded anomalies" such as a Chinese frozen-food package lid that was also a playable record.
Articles from Kempa.com on "parallel grooves", "vinyl video" and "locked grooves"
The 45 Adaptor A short article looking at the history of the 45 RPM spindle adaptor.
Vinyl Underground, a Gallery of Picture Discs and Colored Vinyl Records. Contains hundreds of discs to view.

Audio storage
Lists of things considered unusual